The red spitting cobra (Naja pallida) is a species of spitting cobra native to Africa.

Description

It is often thought of as an attractive species; it is usually bright salmon-red contrasted with a broad black throat band and subocular teardrop markings. However, the color of this species does have variation, which usually depends on where in Africa a particular specimen is found. For example, specimens from southern Kenya and northern Tanzania have an orange-red colour, with a broad, dark blue or black throat band. Some specimens may have two or three throat bands, but this is uncommon for specimens from East Africa. The ventral side is also reddish in colour, sometimes the throat area may be a creamy white. Specimens from other areas can be yellow, pinkish, pink-grey, pale red or steel grey. Most specimens will have a throat band, but it will fade or even sometimes disappear in larger adults. The true red specimens will become reddish-brown in colour as they age and grow in size. The body of this snake is slightly depressed, tapered and moderately slender with a medium-length tail. It is slightly compressed dorsoventrally and subcylindrical posteriorly. The head is broad, flattened and slightly distinct from the neck. The canthus is distinct and the snout is rounded. The eyes are medium to large in size with round pupils. Dorsal scales are smooth and strongly oblique.

Scalation
Dorsal scales on the midbody are in 21–27, ventrals are in 197–228, and subcaudals are in 61–72 rows, subscales are paired, and the anal scale is single. There are seven upper labials, one upper labial enters the eye; two preoculars, three postoculars, and the lower labials are usually eight in number (range 7-9).

Distribution and habitat
The red spitting cobra is mainly found in East Africa, including Djibouti, Eritrea, Somalia, southern Egypt, northern and eastern Ethiopia, and northern Tanzania and northern Sudan. It is also widespread in the dry country of eastern, southern and northern Kenya. They can usually be found near water holes.

Behavior
Red spitting cobras are terrestrial, fast and alert snakes. Adult specimens of this species are nocturnal, while juveniles are more active during the day. Adults like to hide in termite mounds, old logs, holes, brush piles or any other ground cover during the day.  They are also known to be cannibalistic; this could be the reason juveniles and smaller specimens are diurnal, while adults are nocturnal.

When threatened, this cobra rears up and displays a typical cobra hood. It may also hiss loudly. If the intruder does not retreat, it may spray jets of venom to the face of the intruder. In very rare cases, it can even spray its venom without rearing up and display its hood. Venom in the eyes can cause burning pain and blindness. Even so, this snake seldom causes fatalities in humans.

Diet
This species has a wide range of prey, but they prefer amphibians such as toads and frogs, if and when they are available. However, they will prey on rodents, birds and probably other snakes. They are known to raid chickens in the region.

Reproduction
The red spitting cobra is oviparous. The female will lay 6 to 21 eggs.

Venom
The venom of this species, like most spitting cobras, contains a mixture of neurotoxins and cytotoxins. Bite symptoms include slight pain around the wound and numbness of the lips, fingers and tongue. Although it rarely causes human fatalities, survivors are usually disfigured. The murine IP  value for this snake is 2 mg/kg.

In September 2011, a snake keeper from the Eastern Cape in South Africa died shortly after a red spitting cobra sprayed venom into his face while he and a friend were photographing the snake. Some of the venom was believed to have entered his nasal passages and led to anaphylactic shock. His asthma is believed to have contributed to the fatal reaction. An autopsy done on him by the eastern cape provincial pathologist revealed no biting or damage either in his nasal cavities, throat or lungs.

Taxonomy
This species was formerly considered to be a subspecies of Naja mossambica, N. m. pallida, but is now categorized as a separate species.  Indeed, N. mossambica is more closely related to N. nigricollis than to this species. The red spitting cobra is closely related and forms a sister taxon with the Nubian spitting cobra (Naja nubiae) of northeastern Africa, which was originally considered a northern population of N. m. pallida before being recognized as a distinct species in 2003.

References

Naja
Snakes of Africa
Reptiles described in 1896